YesWeHack is a global security company headquartered in Paris, France. It provides a crowdsourced platform for bug bounty programs where ethical hackers can report security exploits and vulnerabilities. It was founded in 2015 by Guillaume Vassault-Houlière, Manuel Dorne and Romain Lecoeuvre.

In 2019, the company raised four million euros from Open CNP, the corporate venture program of CNP Assurances, and Normandie Participations. Two years later, in 2021, YesWeHack raised sixteen million euros in Series B funding. The second round was led by the Series A investors as well as Banque des Territoires and Eiffel Investment Group.

YesWeHack has offices in France (Paris, Rouen, Rennes), Switzerland (Lausanne), Germany (Munich) and Singapore.

In May 2020, the platform was used to test France's homegrown contact-tracing app StopCovid (later renamed TousAntiCovid).

References 

2013 establishments in France
Computer security companies